Juan Leon de Jongh (born 15 April 1988) is a South African rugby union footballer. He became the first choice inside centre for the Stormers in the 2010 Super 14 season after the departure of stalwart and captain, Jean de Villiers. He won his first international cap against Wales on 5 June 2010, during this game he also scored his first international try with a scything break through the Welsh midfield, similar to that of his previous try against the Waratahs in the Super 14 semi-final.

De Jongh was a member of the South African Sevens team that won a bronze medal at the 2016 Summer Olympics. In May 2017 it was announced he would be joining Aviva Premiership side Wasps for the 2017/18 season.

2016 Summer Olympics
De Jongh was included in a 12-man squad for the 2016 Summer Olympics in Rio de Janeiro. He was named in the starting line-up for their first match in Group B of the competition against Spain, with South Africa winning the match 24–0.

Super Rugby Statistics

References

Sources
 Juan de Jongh in, Butch James out The Guardian website
 Juan de Jongh to start for Springboks The BBC website

External links
 
 
 Stormers profile
 
 
 
 
 

Living people
1988 births
South African rugby union players
Stormers players
Western Province (rugby union) players
Rugby union centres
Sportspeople from Paarl
South Africa international rugby union players
South Africa international rugby sevens players
Rugby sevens players at the 2016 Summer Olympics
Olympic rugby sevens players of South Africa
Olympic bronze medalists for South Africa
Olympic medalists in rugby sevens
Medalists at the 2016 Summer Olympics
Wasps RFC players
Rugby union players from the Western Cape